A Gest of Robyn Hode (also known as A Lyttell Geste of Robyn Hode, and hereafter referred to as Gest) is one of the earliest surviving texts of the Robin Hood tales. Gest (which meant tale or adventure) is a compilation of various Robin Hood tales, arranged as a sequence of adventures involving the yeoman outlaws Robin Hood and Little John, the poor knight Sir Richard at the Lee, the greedy abbot of St Mary's Abbey, the villainous Sheriff of Nottingham, and King Edward of England. The work survives only in printed editions from the early 16th century; just some 30 years after the first printing press was brought to England. Its popularity can be estimated from the fact that portions of more than ten 16th- and 17th-century printed editions have been preserved. Written in late Middle English poetic verse, Gest is an early example of an English language ballad, in which the verses are grouped in quatrains with an abcb rhyme scheme.

As a literary work, Gest was first studied in detail by William Hall Clawson in 1909. Research did not resume until 1968, when the medievalist D C Fowler published A Literary History of the Popular Ballad. Since then, study of Gest has been sporadic. In 1989, two historians, R B Dobson and John Taylor, wrote "Rymes of Robyn Hood" as a source book and complete introduction to the subject. In 1997, Stephen Knight and Thomas H Ohlgren published Robin Hood and Other Outlaw Tales, a collection of all the pre-17th-century tales of Robin Hood, arranged in chronological order. Their book now forms the core of the Robin Hood Project of the University of Rochester's Middle English Texts website. In 2013 Ohlgren and linguist Lister M Matheson published Early Rymes of Robin Hood, which includes "as-is" transcriptions of all the earliest surviving copies of Gest for use by scholars.

Summary 

Gest contains four tales which are broken up into episodes, which then interleave among the eight fyttes (sections) of the poem. However, the beginning/end of a tale or episode does not always align with the beginning/end of a fytte. For a modern reader, this makes Gest difficult to follow. This summary follows the outline proposed by J B Bessinger Jr, which follows the order of the fyttes. Bessinger's outline contains four arbitrary names for the tales, which are based upon the main characters:
Robin Hood, Knight, and Abbot (herein called Tale A)
Robin Hood, Little John, Sheriff, and Knight (herein called Tale B)
Robin Hood, Knight, and King (herein called Tale C)
Death of Robin Hood (herein called Tale D)
Each tale is told in 1, 2 or 3 episodes. Quotes from the text have been given with modern spelling.

Tale A

Episode 1 (First Fytte) 

Robin Hood, a good yeoman and courteous outlaw, has heard 3 masses this morning: one to honour God the Father; one to honour the Holy Ghost; and one to honour the Virgin Mary, for whom he has a deep devotion. He has fasted since midnight, and Little John, also a good yeoman, suggests he should eat soon. Robin declines to dine without a guest to pay for the feast. He sends his men to find one and reminds them to do no harm to farmers, yeomen or gentlemen, but to rob bishops, archbishops and the Sheriff of Nottingham should they encounter them. Little John, Much the Miller's son and William Scarlock leave to search for a guest.

They see a knight on horseback in a back street in Barnsdale. He looks forlorn, slouched over in his saddle, his face careworn and streaked with tears. Little John approaches the Sorrowful Knight, genuflects, and welcomes him to the forest, saying his Master Robin Hood is waiting dinner for him. The Knight remarks "He is good yeoman ... /Of him I have heard much good." The Knight leaves with the outlaws.

When Robin Hood sees the Sorrowful Knight, he pushes back his hood, and genuflects to him. They all wash up, and sit down to a fine feast. They enjoy plenty of bread and wine, along with deer sweatbreads, pheasants, swans, and other river birds. The Knight remarks that he had not had such a dinner for weeks, and should he pass through this way again, he would return the favour. Robin retorts that the Knight should pay before he leaves, as it is not proper for a yeoman to pay for a knight's feast. The Sorrowful Knight says he has only 10 shillings, and is embarrassed to offer such a small amount. Little John checks his baggage, and verifies the Sorrowful Knight is truthful.

Robin remarks on the Sorrowful Knight's threadbare clothing, and inquires about his situation. the Sorrowful Knight responds that his ancestors have been knights for 100 years but now he is disgraced, because his son and heir killed a knight of Lancaster. To redeem him, the Sorrowful Knight borrowed 400 pounds from the Rich Abbot of St Mary's, using his lands as collateral. The loan is now due, but he has only 10 shillings, so his lands will be seized by the Abbot. Robin asks if he had any friends. The Knight replies that he had plenty when he was rich, but none that he is poor. Robin then asks if he has anybody who could offer collateral. The Knight replied that he had none "But if it be Our dear Lady;/She failed me never or this day." Robin, who has a deep devotion to the Virgin Mary, declares that she is the best collateral in all of England. He instructs Little John to fetch 400 pounds from their treasure chest, and pay the Knight. Emboldened by Robin's words, Little John suggests new livery in Robin's colours of scarlet and green, and a new horse. Robin offers a grey courser with a new saddle; after all, he says, the Knight is the Virgin Mary's messenger. Much suggests a good palfrey, Scarlock suggests new boots, and Little John suggests shining spurs. Robin adds that a knight can not ride alone, and offers Little John as a companion. "In a yeoman's stead he may thee stand,/If thou great need have."

Episode 2 (Second Fytte) 

The scene switches to York, where the monks of St Mary's Abbey are sitting down to dinner. The Abbot, the Prior, the Chief Steward, the Sheriff of Yorkshire, and the county Justice are discussing the Knight whose debt of 400 pounds is due today. The Prior observes that if it was him, he would pay 100 pounds now and the rest later. The Abbot remarks that the Knight is suffering hunger and cold while serving England's cause overseas. The Prior admonishes the Abbot that, in that case, it would pitiful to take his land; but such a grievous wrong would not bother the Abbot's conscience at all. The Abbot snaps back at the Prior, telling him he's always getting in the way. The "fat-headed"[line 363] Chief Steward suggests that the Knight is either dead or hanged. The county Justice offers his opinion that the Knight will not come. They are all disappointed when the Knight appears at the gate.

The Knight genuflects and salutes them all "great and small". Upset at the Knight's appearance in the Abbey hall, the Abbot skips the customary courtesies and demands if he brought the Abbot's money. Not one penny, the Knight calmly replies. The Abbot snaps back, then why are you here? The Knight answers that he is here to beg for more time. The county Justice sharply interrupts, your time is up and your land is forfeit. Still on one knee, the Knight begs the Justice to "be my frende". The Justice responds that he can not; he is working on retainer from the Abbot. The Knight then looks to the Sheriff, who also refuses to aid the Knight. Finally the Knight offers his services as the Abbot's Knight until the debt is paid. The Abbot rebukes the Knight's offer. "'Out,' he said, 'thou false knight,/Speed thee out of my hall!'" The Knight calls the Abbot a liar, and stands up.

As the Knight approaches, the Justice asks the Abbot how much would he give the Knight to purchase the land outright. 100 pounds is the Abbot's reply; make it 200, insists the Justice. The Knight strides to the Abbot's table, and shakes Robin's 400 pounds out of the bag and onto the table. The Abbot is stunned. He tells the Justice to take the money as an additional retainer. The Justice refuses. The Knight then announces to everyone in the hall that he has paid his debt; his land is his once more. The Knight leaves, now carefree. He travels home with a light heart, singing. His worried wife meets him at the gate to Wyresdale. Be happy, my wife, says the Knight, and pray for Robin Hood; without his kindness, we would be beggars now.

Over the next year the Knight accumulates the 400 pounds to repay Robin Hood. He also purchases 100 bows, 100 bundles of arrows, 100 horses, and hires 100 men clothed in red and white clothing. On the day his debt is due, the Knight and his men head for Barnesdale. At Wentbridge, they pass a fair where a stranger has won the wrestling match. The yeoman is in danger of being killed by the crowd. Remembering how Robin treated him, he orders his company to surround the yeoman, shouting that no harm would befall him. He purchases a cask of wine and breaks it open so that all may drink. But the Knight and his company stay until the fair is done to ensure the yeoman's safety. In the meantime, Robin Hood is waiting under the tree in the greenwood.

Tale B

Episode 1 (Third Fytte) 
It is now autumn. Little John is still the Knight's Yeoman, and joins other young men in longbow target practice. Three times Little John shoots; three times he "split the wand". The Sheriff of Nottingham is impressed. He approaches Little John, asking his name and birthplace. Little John replies, Reynold Greenleaf of Holderness. The Sheriff then asks Little John to work for him. Only if the Sheriff obtains a leave of absence from the Knight, Little John advises. The Knight agrees, and Little John rides off on one of the Sheriff's good strong horses.

One day the Sheriff goes hunting and leaves Little John behind. It is now past noon, and Little John has not eaten. Little John asks the steward for dinner, but is told not until the Sheriff comes home. Little John then threatens the butler, and gives him a strong blow to his back. The butler runs to the pantry and shuts the door. Little John kicks the door open and drinks more than his share of the ale and wine.

The Sheriff's Cook, a bold stout man, confronts Little John. The Cook delivers three strong blows to Little John, who vows that he won't leave until he pays the Cook back. They both draw swords and fight for an hour, with neither gaining the advantage. Little John acknowledges that the Cook is the best swordsman he has ever seen; if he is as good with the bow, the Cook could join with Robin Hood. The Cook agrees. Little John and the Cook sit down to a fine dinner. Then they break the lock on the Sheriff's treasury and steal all the silver dinnerware plus 300 pounds in coin. They leave immediately to meet Robin Hood.

After they greet each other, Robin Hood inquires as who is "that fair yeoman" accompanying Little John, and what is the news from Nottingham. Little John responds that the proud Sheriff sends his greetings, his Cook, his silver tableware, and 300 pounds in coin. Robin replies sarcastically that it wasn't because of the Sheriff's generosity. Little John has a sudden thought to trick the Sheriff. He runs 5 miles to meet the Sheriff, hunting with his hounds. Where have you been, demands the Sheriff. In this forest, replies Little John, I have seen a green hart, with a herd of 140 deer. The Sherriff exclaims, that would be a sight to see! Then quickly follow me, says Little John. When they meet Robin and his 140 men, Little John announces that here is the master hart and his herd of deer! The Sheriff is amazed by how Little John has betrayed him. It's your fault, says Little John, I never got my dinner at your place.

The Sheriff sits down to dinner, and is horrified when he realizes he is eating from his own silver tableware. Robin says, consider it charity, and for Little John's sake, I grant you your life. When dinner was done, Robin tells Little John to strip the Sheriff of his fur-lined mantle and all his fine clothes, and wrap him in a green mantle. Robin then orders the Sheriff's men to do likewise, and lie down next to the Sheriff. All night they lie on the cold ground in only their breeches, shirts, and the green mantles. The next morning, the  Sheriff complains about his stiff muscles. Don't complain, replies Robin, this is how we live; he continues, for the next year, I will teach you how to live as an outlaw. The Sheriff grumbles, not for all the gold in England. He pleads with Robin to let him go. Robin demands that he swear an oath on Robin's sword that he will never again harm Robin or any of his men. The Sheriff swears his oath, and leaves the greenwood.

Tale A (concluded)

Episode 3a (Fourth Fytte) 
It is now one year later. The scene is Robin Hood and Little John in the greenwood. Little John suggests that it is time for dinner, but Robin declines. He fears the Virgin Mary is angry with him, since the Knight has not yet arrived. Little John consoles him, saying that the sun has not yet set, and the Knight is true to his word. Robin instructs Little John to take Much and William Scarlok, and search for an "unknown guest"[line ??]. Irritated, Little John takes up his bow and his sword to do Robin's bidding.

On the highway in Barnesdale they spot a monk on a good palfrey. Little John remarks to Much, here is our pay. The monk is being escorted by 52 men and seven pack horses. Little John tells his companions to prepare for an ambush. He aims his arrow at the monk, ordering him to stop where he is. Calling him a churlish monk, Little John accuses the Monk of angering his master, Robin Hood. ""He is a strong thief," said the monk,/"Of him heard I never good."". Much lets fly an arrow which barely misses the Monk's chest, and he quickly dismounts. All the attendants turn and flee, leaving only a little page and a groom with the pack horses.

Little John brings the Monk to the huntsman's hut. Robin Hood lowers his hood, but the uncourteous Monk does not. Robin asks Little John how many men the monk had. 52 men, is his answer. Blow the horn, orders Robin. 140 men, dressed in striped scarlet, answer the call to run down the Monk's attendants. Robin & Little John force the Monk to wash up for dinner, and they serve him at the table. While he is eating, Robin asks the Monk, to which abbey do you belong & what office do you hold. I am the Chief Steward of St Mary's Abbey, answers the Monk.

Robin Hood is still worried that the Virgin Mary is angry with him, since the Knight has not yet appeared. Little John tells Robin not to worry, the Monk has brought the money; he is from her abbey. 
Robin is not consoled. She was my collateral for a loan I made to the Knight, he says. Speaking to the Monk, Robin asks to see the silver - if he brought it. The Monk swears at Robin, saying he knows nothing of this loan. Robin Hood retorts: God is righteous, and so is the Virgin Mary, you are to blame; you are her servant, and her messenger. How much money do you carry, Robin Hood demands of the Monk. 20 marks of silver, he replies. Robin orders Little John to check the Monk's baggage.

After laying out the contents of the Monk's purse, Little John hurries back to Robin Hood. The Virgin Mary has doubled your money, he declares. Robin is elated. They all drink to her honour. Curious at what is in the packhorses, Robin again asks Little John to search again. The Monk protests strenuously, mounts his horse, and rides off.

Episode 3b (Fourth Fytte) 

It is still daylight when the Knight rides into Barnesdale, and sees Robin Hood standing under the greenwood tree. The Knight dismounts, lowers his hood, and genuflects to Robin. Robin warmly welcomes him, and asks why he is so late. The Knight replies that he stopped to help a poor yeoman in trouble. In that case, rejoins Robin, for helping a good yeoman, I am your friend. The Knight offers the 400 pounds, and 20 marks more for Robin's courtesy. He refuses, saying the money was already delivered by the Monk of St Mary's. But the bows and arrows I brought are a poor payment, says the Knight. Robin sends Little John to retrieve 400 pounds of the Monk's money, and then hands it to the Knight. Buy a horse and a good harness, he says, get some new clothing. And he adds, if ever you need spending money, come see me.

Tale B (concluded)

Episode 2 (Fifth Fytte) 

The Sheriff of Nottingham announces an archery contest for all the best archers of the North. The prize will be an arrow with a head and feathers of red gold, and a shaft of white silver. Upon hearing of the contest, Robin Hood calls his fellowship together. He orders that only six of his men shoot with him; the rest, with arrows nocked, are to keep watch on the Sheriff's men.

Three times Robin shoots, and three times he splits the wand. But so did good Gilberte with the White Hand. The two shoot again, but Robin is best, and wins the prize. The outlaws begin their return to the greenwood, but the fair-goers shout and blow horns. The Sheriff's men loose a hail of arrows, and Robin shouts curses at the Sheriff for breaking his pledge. Many of the fellowship are wounded, including Little John, who took an arrow to his knee. Little John begs Robin not to let the Sheriff take him alive - he tells Robin to inflict mortal wounds to his head. Robin replies, not for all the gold in England! God forbid that you should die, cries Much, and hefts Little John onto his back.

Not far away is the castle of Sir Richard at the Lee, the Sorrowful Knight. Immediately Sir Richard takes in Robin and his men. He orders the gates be shut, the bridge be drawn up, and the walls manned.

Episode 3 (Sixth Fytte) 

The High Sheriff of Nottingham raises a large army from around the countryside to besiege Sir Richard's castle. Traitorous Knight, the proud Sheriff shouts to Sir Richard, you harbor the King's enemy against the law. The Knight courteously agrees that he is doing so. Sir Richard adds, tell our King what has happened, and see what he says.

The Sheriff rides to London, and tells the King that Sir Richard is supporting the outlaw band. Furthermore, he tells the King, Sir Richard is using the outlaws to set himself up as lord of the north land. The King said he would be in Nottingham in two weeks, and that the Sheriff is to gather more archers from all over the countryside. In the meantime, Robin Hood returns to the greenwood, where Little John later joins him after his knee heals.

Having missed his chance to capture Robin, the Sheriff lies in wait to capture Sir Richard instead. He finally overcomes the gentle Knight as he is hawking by the river, and takes him to Nottingham. When Sir Richard's wife is told what has happened, she rides out to the greenwood to find Robin. For Our dear Lady's sake, she implores Robin, don't let my husband be killed for supporting you. Who took your lord, asks Robin. The Sheriff, she replies, and they are not more than three miles from here. Robin quickly gathers his men and they run towards Nottingham.

The fellowship catches up with the Sheriff. Robin stops the Sheriff, asking about the news from the King. Robin then quickly draws his bow, and lets loose an arrow that knocks the Sheriff off his horse. Before the Sheriff can rise, Robin beheads him with his sword. Lie there, proud Sheriff, taunts Robin, no man could trust you while you were alive.

The rest of the fellowship attack the Sheriff's men and cut them down. Robin leaps to Sir Richard's side, cuts his bonds, and hands him a bow. Come to the greenwood with me, Robin orders, until I can get us "... grace/Of Edward, our comely king."

Tale C

Episode 1 (Seventh Fytte) 
The King arrives at Nottingham and asks about Robin Hood and Sir Richard. Hearing what has happened, he seizes the Knight's lands, and searches for Robin throughout Lancashire. Reaching Plompton Park, he notices that there are far fewer deer than usual. Cursing Robin Hood, the King orders Robin to be brought before him, and that anyone who brings him the head of Sir Richard would receive his lands. Then an old knight advises, as long as Robin Hood lives, no man will hold Sir Richard's lands. Six months later, one of the King's royal foresters approaches the King, suggesting a subterfuge to catch Robin. You and five men should dress as monks, he said, and I will lead you into the forest; then you will meet Robin Hood. The King wears a broad abbot's hat to conceal his face, and goes into the forest.

They soon meet Robin, standing in the road along with many of his men. Robin Hood grabs the reins of the King's horse. Sir Abbot, Robin addresses the disguised King, we are but poor yeomen of the forest who live by the King's deer, share with us some of your wealth as an act of charity. The disguised King replies he has only 40 pounds, having spent much during the last two weeks entertaining the King and his lords. If I had 100 pounds, he continues, I would give you half. Robin takes the 40 pounds, counts out 20 pounds, and returns 20 pounds to the disguised King. Our great king bids you come to Nottingham, says the disguised King, and shows Robin the royal seal. Robin immediately genuflects as he says,
	"I love no man in all the world/
	So well as I do my king;/
	Welcome is my lord's seal;"
In honour of the King, Robin invites the disguised King to dinner. Robin blows his horn to assemble the fellowship, who genuflect around him. The disguised King is surprised, realizing that Robin's men are more willing to answer his call than the royal men are to answer the King's call. Quickly the feast is prepared, with Robin and Little John waiting on the disguised King themselves. The disguised King is treated to fat venison, white bread, red wine, and ale.

After dinner, Robin arranges an archery demonstration. The disguised King remarks that the targets were too far away. Robin orders, anyone who misses the target would forfeit his arrows and endure a slap on his face from me. Twice Robin shoots, and twice he splits the wand. On the third attempt, Robin misses, and his men taunt him. Robin approaches the disguised King, offers his arrows, and says he is ready for his slap. The disguised King declines, saying it is against the rules of his order. Do it, declares Robin. The disguised King rolls up his sleeve and deals a resounding slap that knocks Robin to the ground. The disguised King bends over to help Robin up, and as he does so, Robin looks intently into the King's face. Noticing Robin's reaction, Sir Richard does the same. Then both of them genuflect to their King. Robin asks mercy for his men, which the King grants. The King then invites Robin to join Edward's royal court. Only if I can bring my men with me, replies Robin.

Episode 2 (Eighth Fytte) 

The King asks if Robin has any green cloth so he and his men can exchange their black cowls for ones of Lincoln green. Back to Nottingham, the King commands. With feasting, drinking, and singing, the King welcomes Robin and his men into his service, and restores Sir Richard's lands.

Robin and his men spend the next year in the royal court. Robin has spent all his wealth, as well as the money meant for his men. Now only Little John and Scathelock remain. One day, while watching some young men at target practice, he becomes homesick. Robin asks the King for leave to make a pilgrimage to his chapel of Mary Magdalene in Barnsdale. The King grants him seven days.

When he reaches the greenwood with the birds merrily singing. He shoots a hart, and blows his horn. All the outlaws in the forest recognize Robin's horn and come running. They push back their hoods and genuflect, welcoming Robin back. There he remained for twenty-two years.

Tale D

Eighth Fytte 
Robin has a kinswoman who was Prioress of Kirkley. But she and her lover, Sir Roger of Doncaster, are plotting to kill Robin. Since the Prioress is skilled in the art of blood-letting, she lets Robin slowly bleed to death when he comes to Kirkley for treatment. The tale ends with a prayer: "Christ have mercy on his soul,/.../For he was a good outlaw,/And did poor men much good."

Geography 

The place names mentioned in Gest firmly locate Robin Hood in the West Riding of Yorkshire: Blyth; Doncaster; St Mary Magdalene Church at Campsall; and Kirklees Abbey. The cities of York, Lancaster, and Nottingham, as well as the Knight's castle at Wyresdale, are also mentioned.
This area is famous for its wide river valleys, and the eastern foothills of the South Pennines, with its numerous limestone caves where outlaws could hide. But the greenwood of Barnsdale Forest is really Robin's home. "Robyn stood in Barnesdale/And leaned him to a tree," is how the tale of the Sorrowful Knight opens.

Barnsdale Forest 

In medieval England, forest meant an area which is similar to a modern nature preserve, but more like the Yorkshire Dales than the Allegheny National Forest. It was considered waste londe (waste land) which was not capable of being farmed or put to any other purpose. The land thus remained in its natural state. It harboured wild game animals, such as red deer, roe deer, fallow deer, and wild boar, which became the favourite prey of the Saxon, Danish, Norman and Plantagenet kings of England. The hunt was as much a passion of the Norman kings as it was for the Saxon kings. Therefore, the Normans claimed, by right of conquest, the hunting rights of the Saxon and Danish kings. Wild animals were considered to be ownerless property, and therefore the property of the King. Thus, hunting wild animals became a right of the King. To protect their hunting rights, the Norman kings instituted the notorious Forest Laws to protect their favourite hunting grounds.

No records of Barnsdale Forest are known to survive, but there are records of the royal forests surrounding the West Riding of Yorkshire. In late 1222, a furious North Sea gale devastated much of Eastern England. King Henry III issued orders to his forest officials not to remove anything and to submit value estimates of the trees and branches which were felled by the storm. The following January Henry sent orders to the county sheriffs to place the proceeds from the sale of the wind-fallen trees and branches in a religious house in their county. Among others, these orders were sent to those in charge of: Galtres and Pikering Forests (both in the North Riding of Yorkshire); Northumberland and Lancashire (both counties were considered as forests); Nottingham and Sherwood Forests. It is interesting to note that in this list the entire historic county of Lancashire  - which lies west of the West Riding of Yorkshire - was considered a forest area. (After 1310, these forests were granted to the Duke of Lancaster.) Also note that Nottingham Forest (just south of the West Riding) was considered separate from Sherwood Forest.

It is possible that Barnsdale Forest may have been the local name given to part of either the Lancashire Forest or the Nottingham Forest, or both. The Gest poet tells how King Edward travelled 'far and near' in Lancashire looking for Robin Hood. The Gest poet also says that Robin's adversary was the high sheriff of Nottingham. Between 1068 and 1566 the sheriff's full title was High Sheriff of Nottinghamshire, Derbyshire and the Royal Forests. However, Knight and Ohlgren suggest that this confusion about the Sheriff of Nottingham operating in Yorkshire is due to the merger of different ballads by the Gest poet.

The head officer of the Royal Forest was variously called a warden, bailiff or forester, who swore an oath to preserve the vert and venison. The ordinary foresters cared for the newly dropped fawns and their mothers at midsummer; during winter, they provided deer-browse or tree-clippings. They were entitled to pasture their cattle within the forest, and were allowed to let their hogs forage for acorns during the autumn. On their grave slabs, ordinary foresters are identified by their symbol, a horn, which is sometimes shown attached to a baldric. They were not permitted to carry bows, except on direct orders. The chief or royal forester served at the King's pleasure, and his main duty was presiding at the local courts. If the forest had a castle, he was also keeper of the castle. When the King visited, he ensured the animals the King wanted to hunt were herded to where the King wanted to hunt. The chief forester's symbol was the bow.

In Gest, Robin and Little John are praised for their skill with the bow, and Robin gathers his fellowship together by blowing on his horn.

Earliest texts 

A Gest of Robin Hode is considered as one of the three oldest Robin Hood tales. The other two are Robin Hood and the Monk (Child 119) and Robin Hood and the Potter (Child 121). Both of these latter tales survive as manuscripts dated to the second half of the 15th century; however, there are no surviving manuscripts of Gest. The earliest text fragments for Gest are from about a dozen printed editions dated to the 16th and 17th centuries. To identify the most important editions, Child labeled them as a through  g. Texts a through e are referred to as the early texts, and texts f and g are called the later texts. Of interest to linguists and historians is that the later texts replaced some of the obsolete words of the early texts in order to make Gest more understandable to the audiences of the time.  Since Child's time, more editions have been identified by researchers.

John Maddicott has remarked on the lack of variation between the two earliest texts: text a and text b. He interpreted this lack of variation to a standard work being available prior to the printed editions.

text a 
 also known as the Antwerp edition
Entitled A Gest of Robyn Hode; it has no printer's name, location, or date.Formerly known as the Lettersnijder edition, it is attributed to Jan van Doesbroch in Antwerp c. 1510. Although it contains only about 200 of the total 456 quatrains, it is considered the most authentic version of the text, due to the linguistic archaisms in the text. It is housed at the National Library of Scotland.Text a is part of an eleven-text volume known as the Chapman and Myllar prints. However, only nine texts in the volume were actually printed by Chapman and Myllar. Text a was one of the two texts which were not. According to the National Library of Scotland, the volume was presented to the Advocates Library sometime before August 1788 by John Alston of Glasgow. The binding was not sturdy, being made of parchment, which explains why so many pages of text a are lost. (Text a being the last work in the volume.) Sometime between 1798 and 1808 the volume was rebound in London by Charles Hering.The page illustration shown at the top of this article shows the first page of text a. The  woodcut is almost identical to the Yeoman woodcut in Richard Pynson's edition of The Canterbury Tales. However, the typesetter did not leave enough room for the woodcut, and had to reset the first 1-1/2 pages. The typesetter resorted to using abbreviations and run-on sentences to make everything fit.

text b 

 also known as the de Worde edition, c. 1493-1518
Entitled A Lytell Geste of Robyn Hode; it was printed by Wynken de Worde in London.This edition is nearly complete, and may be older than text a. It was used as the base text by Ritson and Gutch. Modern scholars, such as Child, Dobson and Taylor, Knight, and Ohlgren consider it to contain more errors, so they use text a and filled in from text b. It is housed at Cambridge University Library.The edition's date is determined from the type fonts used, and the printer's device on the last page.

texts c through e (Douce Fragments) 
Individual pages which are in poor condition. They are housed at the Bodleian Library.

text f (Copeland edition) 
Entitled A Mery Geste of Robyn Hoode. it was printed in London by William Copeland no earlier than 1548. It is housed at the British Museum.

text g (White edition) 
Entitled A Merry Gest of Robin Hood. it was printed in London for Edward White, and is undated. It is housed at the Bodleian Library.

Pynson's edition (c. 1495-1500) 
Entitled A Lytell Geste. This edition survives as 3 sets of fragments:
text c (Douce Fragment)
single leaf fragment, now housed at Cambridge University Library
two leaves now housed at the Folger Shakespeare Library

Hugo Goes edition 
Entitled A Lytell Geste and printed in York sometime prior to 1509. The only surviving leaf is one of the Douce Fragments (e.12). Hugo Goes worked with one of de Worde's assistants, Henry Watson.  When de Worde moved his business to Fleet Street after 1500, Goes acquired some of his fonts before moving to York to start his own business.

Julian Notary edition (c. 1515) 
Entitled A Lytell Geste. The surviving fragments are four imperfect leaves attached to paper binding strips (Douce fragment f.1).  The attribution to Notary is confirmed by the size and style of the type fonts; he was the only London printer to use 92 mm.

Copeland edition (c. 1565) 
A single leaf fragment of waste print used as spine support for a volume printed in London by John Wolfe in 1584.

It is attributed to Copeland based upon the type font. The date is estimated from the language differences from his 1560 edition. It is housed at the Codrington Library, All Souls College, Oxford.

White edition (copy of the Bodleian Library edition) 
Entitled A Merry Iest of Robin Hood, and printed in London for Edward White, bookseller, c. 1594. The printer is thought to have been Edward Allde. Anthony Munday, author of the Robin Hood plays, was apprenticed to Allde. The text is closely based upon William Copeland's edition, however, the spelling was updated and punctuation was introduced. It is housed at the Chaplin Library, Williams College, Williamstown MA.

Literary analysis 

As a literary work, Gest was first studied in detail by William Hall Clawson in 1909. Clawson was a student of F J Child's successor, George Lyman Kittredge, and his dissertation on Gest expanded on Child's introduction.[v 3, p ?] 
Research did not resume until 1968, when the medievalist D C Fowler published A Literary History of the Popular Ballad. Fowler was one of the first to advocate the study of the English and Scottish ballads relative to their historical time and place, rather than simply within the classification of the Child anthology. In 1974, J B Bessinger Jr attempted to extend Clawson(p 40) and incorporate Fowler's proposal that Gest was a product of 15th-century minstrels. One of Bessinger's important contributions was a narrative schematic that refined Child's "3-ply web"[Child,V,p ?] into 3 tales of 9 episodes distributed among 8 fyttes.

In 1984, Douglas Gray, the first J. R. R. Tolkien Professor of English Literature and Language at the University of Oxford, was the first to consider the Robin Hood and Scottish Border ballads as oral poems. He objected to the then-current definitions of a ballad as some ideal form, whose characteristics were distilled from the Child Ballads. When compared to "this notion of a 'pure ballad', the Robin Hood poems seem messy and anormalous", he contended. Therefore, he titled his article The Robin Hood Poems, and not The Robin Hood Ballads.

However, Gray admitted that the Robin Hood tales, like most popular literature, are sometimes regarded as "sub-literary material", containing formulaic language and a "thin texture", especially "when they are read on the printed page". Additionally, he argued, that since Child had grouped all the Robin Hood 'ballads' together, some literary studies had "rashly based themselves on all the Robin Hood ballads in the collection", instead of discarding those of dubious value. J R Maddicott also recognized this issue, and argued that since so little is known about the origins of the ballads from the available early manuscripts and printed texts, internal evidence has to be used.) Gray further contended that, as oral poetry, each poem should be judged as a performance. He agreed with Ruth Finnegan in considering the performance as "integral to the identity of the poem as actually realized". In an oral performance, a skillful raconteur can draw his audience in, making them part of his performance; hence no two oral performances are identical. Gray points out that one of the characteristics of Gest are scenes with rapid dialogue or conversations, in which the formulaic diction, limited vocabulary, and stereotyped expressions are artfully used to express emotion. Such scenes lying dully on a page can spring into action when recited by one or two talented minstrels.

The Gest poet 
Gest is a compilation of many early Robin Hood tales, either in verse or prose, but most of them now lost. They were woven together into a single narrative poem by an unknown poet, herein called the Gest poet'.

Linguistic analysis 

Francis James Child was the first to look at Gest from a linguistic perspective. While compiling The English and Scottish Popular Ballads, he was in frequent contact with language scholars in England who were collecting quotations from Middle English texts for what would become the first volumes of the Oxford English Dictionary. These scholars, including Walter William Skeat, the leading philologist in England, would later publish A Concise Dictionary of Middle English, and An Etymological Dictionary of the English Language. It was Skeat who provided Child with transcriptions of the texts that appeared in Child's anthology. Skeat also was one of the first philologists to discuss English language dialects in English Dialects from the Eighth Century to the Present Day published in 1911.

In his introduction to Gest, Child tried to argue that the references to Robin Hood in Piers Plowman and the Scottish chronicles indicated a date of composition for Gest as early as 1400, or even earlier. However, he was forced to conclude that "There are no firm grounds on which to base an opinion." Child asserted that there were "A considerable number of Middle-English forms" present; he even constructed a partial listing of the words ending in '-e'. William Hall Clawson, a doctoral student under Child's successor, George Lyman Kittredge, expanded Child's word list, and even calculated the final totals of how many times such words were used in each Fytte. Thus Clawson attempted to "prove clearly that it [Gest] extends back to a period ... antedating the year 1400."

It wasn't until 1985 that a modern linguistic analysis of Gest was performed by Masa Ikegami. He constructed multiple lines of linguistic evidence that Gest was written in a Northern or East Midlands dialect, most probably during the mid- to late-15th century. His evidence is based upon Gest's quatrain structure, its abcb or abab rhyme scheme, and its meter (rhythm pattern). The Gest meter can be summarized as:
the first and third lines have four metrically stressed syllables
the second and fourth lines have three metrically stressed syllables
each stressed syllable is preceded by one or two unstressed syllables
This meter is illustrated in the following quatrain, which should be read aloud in order to hear the rhythm of the stressed syllables (in bold font):

Irregular lines do occur, but they are limited, and only occur in the 3-beat lines.

Evidence of date of composition

Presence of silent final '-e' 
Modern linguists no longer accept the presence of final '-e' (now known as schwa) as evidence for composition prior to 1400. Ikegami provides a summary of other works known to have been composed in the 15th which contain the silent final '-e'.

The silent final '-e' does not have to be pronounced in Gest in order to support the meter (rhythm pattern). Ikegami uses the example of 'grene wode', which Modern English speakers pronounce as two syllables: 'green wood'. In Chaucer's time, the phrase would have been pronounced as four syllables: 'gre-ne wo-de', where the schwa was pronounced as the 'a' in sofa or the 'u' in lucky. The phrase 'grene wode' occurs thirteen times in Gest, and the silent final '-e' never needs to be pronounced in order to "keep the beat".

Presence of new phraseology 
As a replacement for the now-silent '-e', Ikegami points out that the Gest poet introduces a new phrase construct: adjective + adjective|noun + noun. Some examples (with the stressed syllables in bold font and in modern spelling) are:

Ikegami remarks that no works prior to 1400 have this phrasing. Rather, Gest's use of this phrasing is similar to that of The Floure and the Leafe, which is considered to have composed during the third quarter of the 15th century.

Frequent use of 'long e' rhyme 
The Gest poet uses several rhymes that only work if the modern 'long e' sound is used. Some examples, with only the rhyming words shown, follow:

The modern 'long e' sound is considered to be one of the earliest changes associated with the Great Vowel Shift which began c. 1400.

Rhyming 'all' with 'tale' 
This rhyme only works after c. 1400. It is also associated with the great vowel shift.

Evidence of Northern or East Midland dialect 

The linguistic research begun by Skeat and his colleagues (as published in their various Middle English dictionaries) has been continued by modern linguists. Between 1898 and 1905, Joseph Wright published the seminal English Dialect Dictionary, based upon data collected by the English Dialect Society. The famous Survey of English Dialects was undertaken between 1950 and 1961. Therefore, linguists have as detailed an understanding of the various Middle English dialects as the surviving literature and native speakers allow. 
The evidence for a Northern or East Midland dialect within the very words of Gest relies on the observation that, prior to standardization of English language spelling, Middle English authors spelled words as they were pronounced (that is, phonetically). Thus the rhyme words in each quatrain are also very valuable in determining whether or not regional dialects can be identified in Gest. The following is a very brief excerpt of Ikegami's findings; for complete details see his study. The approximate pronunciations are from.

 Northern pronunciation
 The Northern England dialect of Middle English (ME) results from a mixture of the Anglian dialects of Old English (OE) and the Old Norse (ON) of the Danelaw, with an overlay of Norman French.
The OE/ON vowel ā (long a) appears as ME /a:/ (pronounced roughly like the 'a' in father) in the rhyme pair hame:dame. The non-Northern vowel /ɔ:/ (pronounced roughly like 'aw' in law) appears in the rhyme pair more:before.
The OE/ON diphthong āg (equivalent to 'w') appears as ME /au/ (pronounced roughly like the 'ou' in house) in the rhyme pair lowe:shawe. The non-Northern ME diphthong /ɔu/ (pronounced roughly like the 'o' in bone) appears in the rhyme pair lowe:inowe.

 Northern and Eastern Midlands pronunciation
 The Eastern Midlands dialect of ME results from a mixture of the OE Mercian dialect and the ON of the Danelaw, with an overlay of Norman French.
There are two sequences of long vowel pronunciation changes which are characteristic of Northern and Eastern Midland dialects. The OE long vowel ǣ (pronounced roughly like the 'a' in mat) was raised to the ME long open vowel /ɛ:/ (pronounced roughly like the 'a' in hay), and raised again to ME close /e/ (pronounced roughly like the 'e' in bet). Similarly, the OE long vowel ā was also raised to ME long open vowel /ɛ:/, and then raised again to ME close /o:/ (pronounced roughly like the 'oa' in boat). These changes appear in the rhyme pairs: see:the; mone:none; do:theretoo; ere:chere.
Additional vowel pronunciations which are typical of the North and the East Midlands include OE short y appearing as /i/, pronounced roughly like the 'i' in bit (rhyme pair synne:in; and OE or ON long ȳ appearing as /i:/, pronounced roughly like the 'ee' in see (rhyme pair pryde:beside.

Historical analysis 

Modern historical analysis of the internal historical evidence contained within Gest began in 1961 with Maurice Keen's The Outlaws of Medieval Legend, which compared the historical background of the Robin Hood ballads with other legendary and historical outlaw figures. Over the next four decades, various historians contributed to the debate on which historical periods are depicted in the Robin Hood ballads.

In 1968, D C Fowler, published A Literary History of the Popular Ballad as a modern update to Child's Ballads. He criticized Child's arrangement of the Robin Hood ballads; asserting that it encouraged their study without respect to their historical context, and that they were "admired in isolation". Following in Fowler's footsteps, this section focuses on the historical background of Gest and the earliest Robin Hood tales. Most of the Child Robin Hood ballads were composed later (some as late as the 17th century), and therefore are not relevant to this historical discussion.

The linguistic analysis shows that Gest was compiled c. 1450–1475. The literary analysis shows that the component tales were written down prior to 1450 from earlier oral forms which no longer exist. This section looks at the external (actual) historical evidence from the 14th and 15th centuries (political and military events; Medieval Warm Period to Little Ice Age abrupt climate change events; recurring famines, livestock pestilences, and diseases; and resulting social changes) and compares it to the internal historical evidence of Gest (Robin's yeoman status as compared to other yeomen in the tales; which King Edward is referred to; references to changing feudal practices and the abuses of Late Medieval England; and the probable early audiences).

External evidence

Political and military events 
It was not until 2013 that Joseph Taylor, aware of Ikegami's linguistic analysis, examined Gest as a northern text in the historical regional context of northern England. Northeast England has a history of political, cultural, and military separateness from southern England since the Heptarchy, when it was the Kingdom of Northumbria, which was later invaded and settled by the Vikings as the Kingdom of Jorvik. After the Norman Conquest, the Earl of Northumbria and the prince-bishops of the County Palatine of Durham were given political and military power second only to the King in London. The strategic geographic location of the northern counties was formally recognized in 1249 under a treaty which established the Scottish Marches as a buffer zone between Scotland and England. Each of the six Marches (three English and three Scottish) were controlled by their own Wardens. Many of the English East Wardens were appointed from powerful regional families, such as the Percies, the Nevilles, and the Cliffords. The border conflicts meant money and power to these regional families. As "kings in the North", they maintained private armies to control, as well as defend, England's border. The intermittent wars with Scotland also provided political leverage with the King in London, who fully realized that only the northern magnates could mobilize the necessary troops against Scotland — or against London.

This sense of separateness is reflected in the Gest in the way London is portrayed as the power base for the villainous Abbot of St Mary's and Sheriff of Nottingham (see here).

Parliament's rise in importance during the 14th century also provided the Northern magnates with a legitimate means to restrict royal power within their counties.

Abrupt climate change 

The 14th and 15th centuries were made even more turbulent for the people of England and Scotland due to global and Northern hemispheric abrupt climate changes during the interval between the Medieval Warm Period (MWP) and the Little Ice Age (LIA). Part of what is sometimes referred to as the Crisis of the Late Middle Ages, these 200 years (c. 1250–1450) were a cascade of successive related events, including the onset of chaotic weather conditions which resulted in crop harvest declines, famines, livestock pestilences, and multiple episodes of the Black Death in England.

Contributing factors to the abrupt climate changes which marked the transition from the MWP to the LIA have been identified as follows:
 Repeated episodes of volcanic eruptions (c. 1257–1452)
The timeline to the right includes the global and Northern Hemisphere climate-affecting volcano eruptions which occurred during the 13th to 15th centuries. Climate-affecting volcanic eruptions are explosive (VEI>=5) enough to penetrate the stratosphere, and whose sulfate emissions are greater than 1-5 megatons. Recent climate-affecting volcano eruptions are Tambora in 1812-15 (VEI=7), El Chichón in 1982 (VEI=5), and Pinatubo in 1991 (VEI=6).
The eruptions listed in the timeline have been determined by interdisciplinary researchers as being major factors in the climate change from the MWP to the LIA. Between 1229-1458 occurred three of the top 20 stratospheric sulfate-injecting eruptions of the past 2500 years:
the eruption which occurred c. 1229/30 left sulfate deposits in Greenland and Antarctic ice cores, but the source volcano has not yet been identified.
the 1257/58 Samalas eruption (VEI=7 minimum) has been determined to be the largest volcanic gas eruption of the Common Era, containing the highest sulfate concentration of any Holocene eruption. The amount of sulfate injected into the atmosphere is estimated as being twice that injected by the 1815 Tambora eruption. Skeletons found in a mass grave on the site of St Mary Spital, London, have been radiocarbon-dated to this time.
the 1452/58 Kuwae eruption was the largest sulfate gas injection eruption of the last 700 years, surpassing the 1815 Tambora eruption.

In addition to these three global climate-affecting eruptions, spanning approximately 230 years (1229-1458), there were at least ten eruptions which affected the climate of the Northern Hemisphere during approximately the same time interval (1262-1482). In general, a single climate-affecting eruption causes a 0.2-0.3 ℃ cooling; wherein the maximum cooling occurs during the first two years, lesser cooling after 4 years, to be followed by a gradual tapering. The maximum cooling effects from an eruption in the tropics is not felt in the Northern Hemisphere until the first and second summers following the eruption. In contrast, cooling effects from eruptions located in the Northern Hemisphere occur immediately.
Multiple climate-affecting eruptions which occur within decades of each other appear to re-inforce the volcanic cooling effect, evidence of which is found in ice cores, tree-rings, and the geologic record. If the overall climate trend in the Northern Hemisphere is towards cooler conditions, regional climate-affecting eruptions tend to enhance or extend the cooler conditions. These closely-timed climatic-affecting eruptions can produce greater cooling effects than a single large eruption.
There was a series of moderate to large climate-affecting eruptions (1229/30 unidentified, 1257/58 Samalas, 1268, 1275 unidentified, and 1285 unidentified), which resulted in the 13th-century sulfate injections being 2-10 times larger than any other century in the last millennium. Another series of closely-timed eruptions occurred in the mid-15th century (1440 Katla, 1450 Aniakchak, 1452/58 Kuwae, 1471 Sakurajima, 1477 Bárðarbunga, 1480 Mount St. Helens, 1482 Mount St. Helens).
The colder temperatures resulting from the eruptions are perhaps alluded to in Tale B, Episode 1 (Third Fytte) of Gest, when Robin humiliates the Sheriff by forcing him to sleep on the cold ground, clad only in his breeches, shirt, and a green mantle. This fragment, together with the death scene of the Sheriff, were probably written by the Gest poet, who compiled the tales sometime after 1450.

 North Atlantic Ocean climate change (c. 1270–1420)
 Prior to about 1400, the Northern hemisphere atmospheric circulation exhibited both a weak winter Icelandic Low and a weak winter and spring Siberian High. Between about 1400-1420, the North Atlantic Oscillation (NAO) switched from dormant to active.{correct term?} The stronger Icelandic Low increased the regional storminess, and cooler air temperatures led to major increases in sea ice coverage (1313, 1320, 1323, 1331 and 1341, 1348–1351, 1388–1391). This, in turn, led to bad harvests (1308–1309, 1315-1318, 1330-1331) and climatically-induced famines (1308–1310, 1315–1318).
 Dantean Anomaly (c. 1310–20)

 Spörer Minimum (c. 1460–1550)

Recurring famines

Recurring sheep and cattle pestilences

Recurring episodes of the Black Death in England

Social changes 

the Hundred Years' War which was actually three phases of war separated by truces 
ongoing clashes between the York and Lancaster dynasties over the throne of England; which attached the Duchy of Lancaster to the Crown under Henry IV, and the Duchy of York to the Crown under Edward IV. Following the Wars of the Roses, political power was finally consolidated under Henry VII.
social changes caused by the breakup of the English feudal system

One important social change which occurred in response to the changes brought about by the climate, diseases, and militiary upheavals is the gradual change in the meaning of the term yeoman, which is used repeatedly in Gest. During the 14th and 15th centuries, between the time when the component tales were still in oral form and the time when Gest was compiled, the meaning of "yeoman" changed substantially. Originally, "yeoman" was a rank of noble household service as well as the chivalric rank between page and squire. By the late 14th century, it was also used to refer to freeborn and free tenure smallholders. During the 15th century, it began to refer to the growing social category (referred to as a "middling sort"), consisting of the now land-wealthy commoner landowners and the land-poor younger sons of nobility. (Primogeniture dictated that only the eldest son could inherit the family estates.) This self-identification was re-inforced by the 1413 Statute of Additions under Henry V, in which those paying the polltax had to specify their status and occupation. Eventually, "yeoman" expanded to include husbandmen who practiced a trade or craft to supplement their farming income. These shifts in meaning are evident in Gest when the component tales are considered separately from the narrative arc (see here).

Protests

Tax revolts

Summary 

The timelines below summarize the historical political, military, and social events. It also includes dates which reflect the latest interpretations of the internal evidence within Gest. To avoid cluttering the timeline with footnotes, some events (labeled as "most probable date" or "earliest text") are discussed and cited in Internal Evidence.

Internal evidence 
To address this spectrum of possible meanings of 'yeoman' over the centuries, Richard Almond and A. J. Pollard proposed that, within Gest, the 'yeoman' Robin Hood has to be studied (1) separately from the minor characters called "yeoman", and (2) separately from the 'yeoman' of the audience. They referred to this confusion in the various meanings of 'yeoman' as the "slipperiness of social terminology" in the 15th century. However, their main source, Peter Coss, also considered another confusion factor which Almond and Pollard did not address: Gest was compiled from multiple source tales. Therefore, this section presents the various historical clues found within Gest in the context of Bessinger's outline (see here), and the possible source tales (see here),and the changing meanings of 'yeoman'.

Robin as yeoman of the forest? 

Almond and Pollard credited J. C. Holt with being the first historian to recognize the connection between a yeoman and the forest. Based upon clues within the text, Almond and Pollard extended Holt's idea, and proposed that audiences of the 15th century would have recognized Robin Hood as being a forester of Barnsdale or Sherwood because of these clues:
 use of the phrase 'yeoman of the forest'
 The phrase appears in Tale A, Episode 3 (Fourth Fytte), and again in Tale C, Episode 1 (Seventh Fytte). The former scene is when the Chief Steward insults Robin Hood by calling him a thief, to which Little John retorts that Robin is a 'yeoman of the forest'. The latter scene is when Robin Hood stops the disguised king, and introduces himself and his men as 'yeomen of the forest', now forced to dine on the King's deer. Almond and Pollard propose that the importance which appears to be attached to the phrase in these scenes indicate that Robin and his fellowship are more than mere outlaws taking refuge in the greenwood.
 Since both episodes are considered to have come from unrelated sources, it is perhaps significant the phrase only occurs in lines which can be attributed to the Gest poet as part of the set up for Episode 3 in Tale A, and for Episode 1 in Tale C. 
 Robin 'walking' in the forest
 In Tale B, Episode 3 (Sixth Fytte), Robin is described as walking in the forest, much to the chagrin of the Sheriff. Almond and Pollard suggest that "walking" should be interpreted in the sense of walking associated with an occupation, such as a "police officer walking his beat" meaning a police officer patroling his assigned area. This interpretation is supported by  who described the foresters as sworn to protect the "vert and venison" within their assigned areas, which were known as divisions, wards, bailiwicks, or walks.
 This phrase occurs after Robin and his men leave Sir Richard's castle, and before the Sheriff captures Sir Richard. It may be a part of a transition between fragments of two separate tales. 
 other 'good yeomen' who 'walk'
 In Tale A, Episode 1 (First Fytte), Robin forbids his men to waylay "good yeoman/That walketh by green wood shawe [thicket]". Almond and Pollard suggest that here Robin is referring to the other forest officials who were also yeomen: verderer, woodward, ranger, or agister.
 only a 'proud forester' can catch Robin
 In Tale C, Episode 1 (Seventh Fytte) only a "proud forester" in royal service knows how to track Robin down. And that was by disguising the King as an abbot and five of his bodyguards as monks; in other words, it takes a forester to catch a forester. It is unknown if this opening fragment is from a now-lost tale or part of the Gest poet's transition between the Sixth and Seventh Fyttes.

Robin's knowledge of royal hunt rituals 

Almond and Pollard have traced some of the hunting rituals and terminology found in Gest back to The Master of Game, a hunting book translated in 1413 from French by Edward, Duke of York. They point out that in all the English-language 15th-century hunting literature, 'yeoman' is used consistently to refer to the hunt and forest officials.

"Bow and stable" was the hunting technique in which herds of deer are driven by foresters and professional huntsmen towards the stationary noble hunters. The tryst tree is where the noble huntsman stood, with his bowbearer and his hound handlers, to await the deer being flushed toward them. Sometimes a lodge or hut made of green boughs would be built at the tryst for shelter as well as camouflage.

Almond and Pollard compare the 'royal' dinner prepared by Robin for the disguised King in Tale C, Episode 1 (Seventh Fytte) to that described in The Master of Game. Believing the abbot to be the King's emissary since he carries the Privy Seal, Robin invites him to a royal hunt. Robin escorts his honored guest by the hand (as is required of the yeoman of the bow) to the tryst tree. There the deer are slain and ritually butchered (dyghtande is a northern England term for the ritual). The butchering is done by Robin himself for the disguised King, who was given the prime cuts of venison, along with bread and wine.

In Gest, the huntsman's hut serves as the tryst tree for the dinners with the Knight in Tale A, Episode 1 (First Fytte) and the Chief Steward of St Mary's in Tale A, Episode 3a (Fourth Fytte). The Knight is given swan and pheasant, a noble's repast, but also the numbles, which was traditionally reserved for the foresters and the huntsmen.

This royal (or noble) hunt familiarity may indicate that the Gest poet was a member of either a royal or noble household. Or it may indicate that hunting tales were part of his repertoire. Or both. Coss proposes that the Gest poet had a fairly large body of source material from which to choose. And since he chose to weave his sources together, rather than lay them end-to-end, it is difficult to untangle the now-lost tales which he used.

Comparison with Chaucer's yeoman 

Almond and Pollard also credited J. C. Holt as the first historian to notice the resemblance between Robin Hood and Geoffrey Chaucer's The Knight's Yeoman in The Canterbury Tales. But Holt never realized the significance of the Yeoman's accoutrements: his green coat and hood, his bow and arrows; his buckler and sword; and his horn attached to a green baldric. All of which indicated the Yeoman was a forester and huntsman; a position with which Chaucer was certainly familiar. He served as forester of North Petherton Park in Somersetshire for the last decade of his life.

The green livery of the forester and huntsman is depicted in many of the miniatures of the Livre de chasse, written by Gaston III, Count of Foix, in the late 14th century.

The minor yeoman characters 
 Tale A yeomen
 Much, the Miller's son, and Will Scarlock, are both described as yeomen in Episode 1 (First Fytte), as they stand on the Saylis looking for Robin's guest. When combined with Robin's description of his men as 'yeomen of the forest' in Tale C, Episode 1 (Seventh Fytte), the implication is that they are both foresters.(See above.)
 In Episode 3a (Sencond Fytte), the young men participating in the wrestling match are described as yeomen. But since no details are given, the exact meaning is uncertain.
 Tale B yeomen
 In Episode 1 (Third Fytte), Robin welcomes Little John back to the greenwood, and refers to the Sheriff's cook as a "fair yeoman". Robin probably recognized the cook's clothing as being from the Sheriff's household. 'Yeoman' was a service rank in the household kitchen.
 Tale C yeomen
 In Episode 2 (Eighth Fytte), the townspeople of Nottingham are called "both yeomen and knaves". Here 'yeomen' refers to the tradesmen, and knaves refers to the common laborers.
 Little John as yeoman and knave
 In Tale A, Episode 1 (First Fytte), Little John is introduced as a "good yeoman" standing next to Robin. Throughout Gest, Little John refers to Robin as his master. He also demonstrates a courtesy equal to that of Robin's in his interactions with the Sorrowful Knight and the disguised King.At the end of Episode 1, Robin offers Little John's service to the Sorrowful Knight as knave, who can serve as a yeoman in time of need. Here the meaning of 'knave' is an attendant, and 'yeoman' refers to the military (chivalric) rank.
 In Tale B, Episode 1 (Third Fytte), Little John, in the guise of Reynold Greenleaf the knave, infiltrates the Sheriff's household in order to wreak vengeance on the Sheriff.

Which King Edward? 
Almond and Pollard's approach coincides neatly with the results of Thomas Ohlgren's study of 'which' King Edward is meant in Gest. Ohlgren asserts that the individual tales were composed during the early decades of the reign of Edward III (r 1327–1377). He bases his assertion on internal evidence (references made in the text) concerning feudalism, livery and maintenance, and other details that can be traced back to Edward III's reign. Ohlgren proposes that Gest was compiled from these individual tales during the reign of Henry V (1413–1422) or Henry VI (first reign 1422–1461). He uses the example of the 14th-century political poems of Lauence Minot, whose poems were recopied during Henry V's reign to celebrate Henry's victories in France. Similarly, some of the Robin Hood tales which referred to Edward III could have been compiled as Gest. Ohlgren argues that cultural references made in the original tales would only be understood by an audience who was no more than two or three generations later than Edward III. To support his assertion, Ohlgren considers clues which can be found within the text of Gest.
 "Edward our comely King"
 The king is referred to as "Edward, our comely king". But which King Edward is it? The epithet is the first clue. Olhgren recently discovered a similar epithet in the political poetry written by Laurence Minot in the 14th century. Minot composed poems in Middle English celebrating the victories of Edward III, including those against the Scots (Battle of Halidon Hill in 1333) and against the French (Siege of Guînes (1352)). They were probably written not long after the events, but eleven of his political poems were revised c. 1352 to form a continuous narrative. They were popular enough to have been recopied during the reign of Henry V or Henry VI (our earliest surviving text is dated to 1425-50). Minot's poem IV begins:

 Ohlgren considered this significant, as only two works are known to use the phrase "Edward our comely king": Minot's poem IV and Gest. By itself, this evidence is not convincing; but the other three clues, which are inter-related, add weight to his argument.
 "far beyond the sea/In England right"
 In Tale A, Episode 2 (Second Fytte), the greedy Abbot is gloating that this is the Knight's last day to repay his debt, then his lands will be forfeit. The kind-hearted Prior rebukes the Abbot:

 "Far beyond the sea" has been usually interpreted as the Knight being on crusade or a pilgrimage, but Ohlgren considers it to mean that the Knight was fighting in France at the beginning of the Hundred Years War. "In England right" was the rallying cry for Edward III's legal claim to certain territories in France - and to the French throne. The phrase appears 4 times in Minot's poems, and it always refers to Edward's legal claim.
 "Saint Quentin"
 In Tale B, Episode 2 (Fifth Fytte), Sir Richard at the Lee shelters Robin and his fellowship from the Sheriff's posse comitatus:

 Sir Richard swears by Saint Quentin to house Robin for forty days. Saint Quentin was a 3rd-century Christian martyr whose pilgrimage cult at the Basilica of Saint-Quentin in Saint-Quentin, Aisne flourished during the Middle Ages. Saint-Quentin is not far from Thiérache, site of the first encounter between Edward III and Philip VI of France during the chevauchée of 1339.
 Possible source tales for the Seventh Fytte
 Ohlgren draws attention to two tales which are considered part of the "King and Subject" tradition as described by Child: King Edward and Shepherd (hereafter called Shepherd) and King and Hermit (hereafter called Hermit). Both tales were mentioned by Child as part of his discussion of King Edward the Fourth and a Tanner of Tamworth (#273).[Child, V, p ??] Curiously, Child included Tanner, which survives as a 17th-century text, but he does not include either Shepherd or Hermit, both of which survive as incomplete manuscripts dated c. 1450. In Olgren's study of the two tales, he has concluded that there is nothing "to preclude their having been used as the sources for the 'King and the Subject' theme in Gest."
 Shepherd is preserved as part of the same manuscript which contains Robin Hood and the Monk. Shepherd unambiguously describes Edward III as the King:
 born at Windsor Castle
 father was a Welsh knight; mother was named Isabella
 his steward is Ralph Stafford, 1st Earl of Stafford
 Henry of Grosmont, 1st Duke of Lancaster, and John de Warenne, 7th Earl of Surrey, are mentioned
 "Hermit" is preserved ...
 Shepherd and Hermit share plot similarities: a disguised king who seeks out his subjects to listen to their complaints; he dines on what turns out to be a dinner consisting of poached venison and fowl; the subject engages the king in a drinking game; the king invites the subject to court, where the king's true identity is revealed. Both tales contain interesting plot details which parallel Gest:
 In Shepherd, a hand-washing ritual occurs prior to the feast at court; in Gest the ritual occurs prior to Robin's meals with the Knight and with the Monk.
 The first meal provided by the Shepherd to the King is similar to that provided by Robin to the Knight.
 The second meal provided by the Shepherd to his King is similar to the meal provided by Robin to his King.
 In Hermit, the King is lured into the forest by the promise of a great-headed deer. The incident occurs five miles from Nottingham. In Gest, this is similar to Little John's ruse to lure the Sheriff into the greenwood, in which Little John runs five miles to the Sheriff's hunting party with news of a great green hart.
 Cultural memory of Edward III
 Shepherd and Hermit, as well as the political poems of Minot, are examples of a cultural memory of Edward III which still existed some three or four generations after his death. (This cultural memory may have been encouraged by Henry IV, a grandson of Edward III, who had usurped the throne from Richard II, son of Edward the Black Prince, in 1399.) Edward was remembered as having concern for his subjects, and was committed to redressing injustices committed by his officials.
 Another popular text was the "De reginine principum", which was translated (1411-12) into Middle English by Privy Seal clerk Thomas Hoccleve as the Regiment of Princes. Hoccleve addressed his poem to Henry of Monmouth, Prince of Wales and Duke of Lancaster (the future Henry V). Henry IV was in poor health, and his son had taken over the reins of government in 1410. In the Regiment of Princes, Hoccleve included many references to Edward's personal life and events of his time. Hoccleve advices Henry to personally find out what his subjects think of him in the section "Of Justice". Like "Edward the last", Henry should travel among his subjects "in simple array alone" "To hear what men said of thy person" (modern spelling). The King is obligated to help them. If his officials are oppressing the people, he is to redress the wrongs done.

Sir Richard as army recruiter? 
Ohlgren draws attention to the Knight's activities during the year before his 400-pound debt repayment is due to Robin Hood in Tale A, Episode 2 (Second Fytte). The Knight's income from his lands is only 400 pounds, so how is he paying for the men and equipment?

Ohlgren proposes that the money could have come from two sources: indenture and purveyance. Indenture was started by Edward I as a way of supplementing the number of troops raised through the feudal (tenure) levies, but it became almost standard practice under Edward III, who used it to recruit the rank and file of his armies.[1954_Lyon, p 503-4] In the 14th and 15th centuries, purveyance[MED, sense 3, 4] meant recruiting men, clothing them, furnishing the equipment for a campaign, and providing food and transportation for them to the English coast. The 100 men-at-arms mentioned in the text don't seem to have been the Knight's personal retinue, the uniforms being red and white. These colors belonged to Richard Fitzalan, 3rd Earl of Arundel, who served in almost all of Edward III's French campaigns. Recruiting and outfitting these men could have earned the Knight between 250 and 650 pounds.

Livery and fees 

Livery originally referred to a lord providing food and clothing to his household servants. It later expanded to refer to the distinctive uniform worn by the lord's servants.[1911_EB_livery] Under the original English feudalism as imported by the Normans, a tenant-in-chief's feudal obligations to the king were originally defined by tenure. Those who accepted lands from the king were expected to return specified services at his command, such as fealty, suit of court, and military service. The latter was known as knight's service. The English invasions of Scotland during the reign of Edward I demanded more men-at-arms and archers than the traditional feudal methods could supply. This situation became even more acute under his grandson Edward III at the beginning of the Hundred Years War. Indentures were drawn up between the king and his lords, and between the lords and their sub-tenants or captains of men, for the provision of a certain number of men-at-arms and archers. These men were equipped with weapons and furnished with distinctive clothing or badges as a means of identification.[2015_Storey]

Under a strong king, such as Edward III, the increased power of regional magnates afforded by this practice could be restrained, but under a weak king, such as Richard II, abuses became rampant. In 1377, 1384, and 1388, Parliament protested against the abuses, now referred to as livery and maintenance. Parliament was concerned about the increasing number of liveried retainers involved in violence and riots who expected to escape legal retribution through the sheriffs and justices of the peace who could be retained by their lord.[2015_Storey]

Throughout Gest, there are several references to the expanded use of livery and fees during the 14th and 15th centuries.
The following incidents indicate that Robin bestowed liveries upon his men (or at least provided the cloth). As mentioned above, this was considered acceptable practice during wartime under the terms of the indentures with Robin, who is considered a yeoman leader, or captain, of men.

 Robin Hood and the Knight
 In Tale A, Episode 1 (First Fytte), Robin Hood agrees to provide livery to the threadbare Knight. Little John then measures out a generous three yards of scarlet and raye (striped)[MED_raye] cloth, which he hands over to the Knight.
 Little John and the Cook
 In Tale B, Episode 1 (Third Fytte), on Robin's behalf, Little John offers to the Cook twenty marks and two sets of clothing per year as incentive to join Robin's fellowship.
 Robin and King Edward
 In Tale C, Episode 2, (Eighth Fytte), King Edward asks to purchase from Robin green cloth to replace their gray monk's robes.
 Robin at Edward's court
 In Tale C, Episode 2 (Eighth Fytte), Robin has spent all his wealth on fees for his men.

 Sheriff and Little John
 In Tale B, Episode 1 (Third Fytte), the Sheriff offers to retain Little John as a member of his household for 20 marks per year.

However, the most prominent incident is the illegal practice of 'cloth and fee' described in Tale A, Episode 2 (Second Fytte). 'Cloth and fee' (another name for livery and fee) refers to the payment of money and gifts of clothing to the King's justice in return for favorable legal services. This practice became so prevalent that, in 1346, Edward III issued a statute requiring his justices to swear an oath that they would only accept 'cloth and fee' from the King himself. In this episode, the Abbot is trying to defraud the Knight of his land, so he retains a County Justice, the King's officer, to force the issue in the Abbot's favor. Once the Abbot has publicly insulted the Knight, the Chief Justice seeks to defuse the situation by suggesting the Abbot offer to purchase the land outright. The ridiculously low price offered by the Abbot is yet another insult to the Knight, which prompts the Knight to empty the bag of Robin's 400 pounds onto the Abbot's table. The Knight then declares to all present to bear witness to the fact that he has redeemed his land legally.

Archery

Audience

No evidence

Peasants' revolt of 1381 
Most of the initial historical interpretations placing Gest during the 14th century were based upon a misreading of Child's discussion of a possible date of composition for Gest. Child placed his conclusion ("There are no firm grounds on which to base an opinion.") at the end of a lengthy discussion in which he unsuccessfully attempted to date Gest to 1400 or earlier. Based upon this misreading, for the next century scholars continued to propose that since Piers Plowman is connected with the Peasants' revolt, and since the priest Sloth mentions "rymes of Robyn Hode", then Robin Hood is also connected. However, Langland gives no indication as to what these rhymes are, and there are no surviving rhymes from Langland's lifetime.

According to Richard Almond and A. J. Pollard, the association between Robin Hood and the issues of the Peasants' Revolt was first made by Rodney Hilton in 1958, when he described Robin Hood as "a free peasant representing peasant ideology for a peasant audience". However, in 1961, J. C. Holt rebutted Hilton, asserting that the Robin Hood tales were composed in castle and manor halls, a position Holt expanded upon in his book. Since then, a consensus has emerged that Robin Hood represented a new social group above the peasants and below those who bore a coat of arms, a group which is often referred to as the "middling sort". There is no internal evidence that the source tales used by the Gest poet were concerned with the peasants' issues.

However, there was urban unrest in the Yorkshire towns of Scarborugh, Beverley, Hull, and York in 1381.

Forest law 
In Gest, several references to Robin Hood's fellowship poaching the King's deer are mentioned as passing remarks, and never further developed in the tales:
 when itemizing the Knight's dinner menu in Tale A, Episode 1 (First Fytte), and the King's dinner menu in Tale C, Episode 1 (Seventh Fytte)
 in the transition between the Sixth and Seventh Fyttes, the Gest poet speaks of how King Edward travelled throughout Lancashire, without seeing the usual large herds of deer
 when Robin Hood accosts the disguised King Edward in Tale C, Episode 1 (Seventh Fytte)

Furthermore, the Gest poet never explains why Robin Hood is an outlaw, nor why the Sheriff of Nottingham is a special target. It's as though an explanation is not needed by the audience of that time. In the earliest tales, Robin Hood is already an outlaw. An early life of Robin Hood did not appear until Ritson's 1795 anthology, which was a collection of fictitious detail

Importance as an English ballad 

Gest was originally classified by F J Child as an early example of a Middle English language ballad, based upon its quatrain structure and rhyme scheme. Since the publication of Child's anthology, various scholars have attempted to construct a classification for the ballads. Gest, along with the border ballads, and the other Robin Hood ballads, have been recognized as being distinct from the other Child ballads. They are narratives, which generally lack a chorus or refrain, and appear to have been composed as recitations before an audience. Only Gest is considered comparable to the Danish and English heroic ballads, the epic poem Beowulf, and the great Middle English romances - Havelok the Dane and The Tale of Gamelyn.

Importance to English Romantic literature 

With the rise of English Romanticism in the late 18th century came a resurgence in the popularity of the Robin Hood ballads. Gest was reprinted several times as part of various anthologies, the first of which was Robin Hood: A collection of all the Ancient Poems Songs and Ballads now extant, relative to that celebrated Outlaw, edited by Joseph Ritson in 1795 (followed by later editions in 1820, 1832 and 1885).

Ivanhoe 

Walter Scott, a Scottish poet, is regarded to have started the 19th-century medieval revival. But it was his Waverley novels, particularly Ivanhoe, which pioneered the historical romance genre.
Scott's fascination with the stories and ballads of the Scottish Borders began in 1773 when he moved to his grandparents' farm, Sandyknowe, at Smailholm near Kelso. He was recovering from a bout of polio and his parents thought he would recover with fresh air and exercise. When he couldn't go outside, he would read. Percy's 1765 Reliques of Ancient English Poetry became one of Scott's favorites. After returning to Edinburgh, he studied law, and was admitted to the Faculty of Advocates in 1792. Scott was Curator of the Advocates Library between 1795-1799 and 1805–1809. Sometime prior to 1788, the Advocates Library was given the volume known as the Chapman and Myllar prints, which contains the Antwerp edition of Gest (text a). In 1808 it appears that Scott was involved in having the volume taken to London and re-bound. Scott was a friend to Joseph Ritson, and encouraged him to complete his 1795 collection of Robin Hood ballads, which contains a transcription of the de Worde edition of Gest (text b). He keenly appreciated Ritson's editorial emphasis on textual accuracy, and used Ritson's anthology to invent the character of Locksley in Ivanhoe.

Echoes from Gest can be found throughout Ivanhoe: in its various locations in the West Riding of Yorkshire; in the use of elements of Gest in key scenes at the Tournament of Ashby; and in Scott's re-use of the Gest poet's feasting scene motif to highlight important plot twists.

Adaptations

Gest has influenced modern versions of the Robin Hood tales, but not as much as the other Robin Hood ballads. The adaption which bears obvious traces is the popular boy's book written by Howard Pyle in 1883. Pyle's book was later a huge influence on how Hollywood would portray Robin Hood.

Howard Pyle's Merry Adventures 

Howard Pyle's contribution to the Robin Hood revival of the 19th century was his richly illustrated children's book The Merry Adventures of Robin Hood. Following in the footsteps of Walter Scott, Pyle had Robin Hood roaming Sherwood Forest (not Barnsdale) during the reign of King Richard the Lion-heart (not comely King Edward).

The Sorrowful Knight tale is related in Chapters I-II of Part Fifth. The story is barely recognizable from that in Gest (Pyle replaced most of Fytte 1 with his own version of how the Knight received his money; not from Robin, but from the Bishop of Hereford, who "conveniently" came to Robin's feast). Pyle (an artist from Wilmington DE) was writing for a juvenile audience, emphasized prose descriptions that are as richly detailed as his drawings. However, the Gest poet performs the same description much more economically.

Pyle does capture the light-hearted tone of the Gest poet when the Knight asks, who stops a traveller on the King's highway. Robin's response recalls the reactions of the Sorrowful Knight (in Fytte 1) and the Monk of St Mary's (in Fytte 2) upon hearing Robin's name.

Pyle ends his tale of the Sorrowful Knight with words that echo the "lyth and listen" formulaic of the Gest poet:

Pyle also includes the episode of the wrestling yeoman, but to tie it more clearly into the novel, he made the man David of Doncaster, a Merry Man from Robin Hood and the Golden Arrow, though even this made the episode odd among Pyle's novelistic effects.

Notes

References

Further reading 

Contemporary criticism of Wilgus' survey of ballad scholarship

Contemporary criticism of Clawson's analysis

Hart's classification of Child's ballads according to the complexity and elaboration of the narrative

Description of original sources stored at The National Archives, Kew

External links

A Gest of Robyn Hode (Modernized)
A Gest of Robyn Hode (Original)
A Little Geste of Robin Hood and his Meiny (in modern English spelling)
"The History of English Podcast: Episode 136 - The Real Robin Hood"
"Robin Hood – The Man, The Myth, and The History – Part 1: Of Tales and Legends"
"Robin Hood – The Man, The Myth, and The History – Part 2: The Outlaws of Medieval England"
"Robin Hood – The Man, The Myth, and The History – Part 3: The Men of the Longbow"
"Robin Hood – The Man, The Myth, and The History – Part 4: Will the Real Robin Please Stand Up?"

Middle English poems
Robin Hood ballads
Child Ballads